Štítná nad Vláří-Popov is a municipality and village in Zlín District in the Zlín Region of the Czech Republic. It has about 2,100 inhabitants.

Administrative parts
The municipality is made up of villages of Popov and Štítná nad Vláří.

Twin towns – sister cities

Štítná nad Vláří-Popov is twinned with:
 Košeca, Slovakia

References

Villages in Zlín District